Eartha Mae Kitt (born Keith; January 17, 1927 – December 25, 2008) was an American singer and actress known for her highly distinctive singing style and her 1953 recordings of "C'est si bon" and the Christmas novelty song "Santa Baby".

Kitt began her career in 1942 and appeared in the 1945 original Broadway theatre production of the musical Carib Song. In the early 1950s, she had six US Top 30 entries, including "Uska Dara" and "I Want to Be Evil". Her other recordings include the UK Top 10 song "Under the Bridges of Paris" (1954), "Just an Old Fashioned Girl" (1956) and "Where Is My Man" (1983). Orson Welles once called her the "most exciting woman in the world". She starred as Catwoman in the third and final season of the television series Batman in 1967.

In 1968, her career in the U.S. deteriorated after she made anti-Vietnam War statements at a White House luncheon. Ten years later, Kitt made a successful return to Broadway in the 1978 original production of the musical Timbuktu!, for which she received the first of her two Tony Award nominations. Her second was for the 2000 original production of the musical The Wild Party. Kitt wrote three autobiographies.

Kitt found a new generation of fans through her roles in the Disney films The Emperor's New Groove (2000), in which she voiced the villainous Yzma, and Holes (2003). She reprised the role as Yzma in the direct-to-video sequel Kronk's New Groove (2005), as well as the animated series The Emperor's New School (2006–2008). Her work on the latter earned her two Daytime Emmy Awards. She posthumously won a third Emmy in 2010 for her guest performance on Wonder Pets!

Early life
Eartha Mae Keith was born in the small town of North, South Carolina, on January 17, 1927. Her mother Annie Mae Keith was of Cherokee and African descent. Though she had little knowledge of her father, it was reported that he was a son of the owner of the farm where she had been born, and that Kitt was conceived by rape. In a 2013 biography, British journalist John Williams claimed that Kitt's father was a white man, a local doctor named Daniel Sturkie. Kitt's daughter, Kitt McDonald Shapiro, has questioned the accuracy of the claim. Eartha's mother, Annie Mae Keith (later Annie Mae Riley), soon went to live with a black man who refused to accept Eartha because of her relatively pale complexion; she was raised by a relative named Aunt Rosa, in whose household she was abused. After the death of Annie Mae, Eartha was sent to live with another relative named Mamie Kitt (who may, in fact, have been her biological mother) in Harlem, New York City, where she attended the Metropolitan Vocational High School (later renamed the High School of Performing Arts).

Career

Kitt began her career as a member of the Katherine Dunham Company in 1943 and remained a member of the troupe until 1948. A talented singer with a distinctive voice, she recorded the hits "Let's Do It", "Champagne Taste", "C'est si bon" (which Stan Freberg famously burlesqued), "Just an Old Fashioned Girl", "Monotonous", "Je cherche un homme", "Love for Sale", "I'd Rather Be Burned as a Witch", "Kâtibim" (a Turkish melody), "Mink, Schmink", "Under the Bridges of Paris" and her most recognizable hit "Santa Baby", which was released in 1953. Kitt's unique style was enhanced as she became fluent in French during her years performing in Europe. She spoke four languages (she is thought to have learned German and Dutch from her stepfather, English from her mother, and French from the European cabaret circuit) and sang in eleven, which she demonstrated in many of the live recordings of her cabaret performances. Diana Ross said that as a member of The Supremes she largely based her look and sound on Kitt's.

Career peaks

In 1950, Orson Welles gave Kitt her first starring role as Helen of Troy in his staging of Dr. Faustus. Two years later, she was cast in the revue New Faces of 1952, introducing "Monotonous" and "Bal, Petit Bal", two songs with which she is still identified. In 1954, 20th Century Fox distributed an independently filmed version of the revue entitled New Faces, in which she performed "Monotonous", "Uska Dara", "C'est si bon", and "Santa Baby". Though it is often alleged that Welles and Kitt had an affair during her 1957 run in Shinbone Alley, Kitt categorically denied this in a June 2001 interview with George Wayne of Vanity Fair. "I never had sex with Orson Welles," Kitt told Vanity Fair: "It was a working situation and nothing else." Her other films in the 1950s included The Mark of the Hawk (1957), St. Louis Blues (1958) and Anna Lucasta (1958). Kitt had a minor hit in Sweden 1956 with her record in Swedish, "Rosenkyssar" ("Rose Kisses", RCA FAS 511).

Throughout the rest of the 1950s and early 1960s, she recorded; worked in film, television, and nightclubs; and returned to the Broadway stage, in Mrs. Patterson (during the 1954–1955 season), Shinbone Alley (in 1957), and the short-lived Jolly's Progress (in 1959). In 1964, Kitt helped open the Circle Star Theater in San Carlos, California. In the late 1960s, Batman featured Kitt as Catwoman after Julie Newmar had left the show in 1967. She appeared in a 1967 Mission: Impossible episode "The Traitor," as a contortionist.

In 1956 she published an autobiography called Thursday's Child, which would later serve as inspiration for the name of the 1999 David Bowie song "Thursday's Child".

The "White House Incident"
In January 1968, during Lyndon B. Johnson's administration, Kitt encountered a substantial professional setback after she made anti-war statements during a White House luncheon. Kitt was asked by First Lady Lady Bird Johnson about the Vietnam War. She replied: "You send the best of this country off to be shot and maimed. No wonder the kids rebel and take pot."
During a question-and-answer session, Kitt stated:

Her remarks reportedly caused Mrs. Johnson to burst into tears. It is widely believed that Kitt's career in the United States was ended following her comments about the Vietnam War, after which she was branded "a sadistic nymphomaniac" by the CIA. A defamatory CIA dossier about Kitt was discovered by Seymour Hersh in 1975. Hersh published an article about the dossier in The New York Times. The dossier contained comments about Kitt's sex life and family history, along with negative opinions of her that were held by former colleagues. Kitt's response to the dossier was to say: "I don't understand what this is about. I think it's disgusting." Following the incident, Kitt devoted her energies to performances in Europe and Asia.

Broadway
In the 1970s, Kitt appeared on television several times on BBC's long-running variety show The Good Old Days, and in 1987 took over from fellow American Dolores Gray in the London West End production of Stephen Sondheim's Follies and returned at the end of that run to star in a one-woman-show at the same Shaftesbury Theatre, both to tremendous acclaim. In both those shows performing the show-stopping theatrical anthem "I'm Still Here". Kitt returned to New York City in a triumphant turn in the Broadway spectacle Timbuktu! (a version of the perennial Kismet, set in Africa) in 1978. In the musical, one song gives a "recipe" for mahoun, a preparation of cannabis, in which her sultry purring rendition of the refrain "constantly stirring with a long wooden spoon" was distinctive. She was nominated for the Tony Award for Best Actress in a Musical for her performance. In the late 1990s, she appeared as the Wicked Witch of the West in the North American national touring company of The Wizard of Oz. In 2000, Kitt again returned to Broadway in the short-lived run of Michael John LaChiusa's The Wild Party. Beginning in late 2000, Kitt starred as the Fairy Godmother in the U.S. national tour of Cinderella. In 2003, she replaced Chita Rivera in Nine. Kitt reprised her role as the Fairy Godmother at a special engagement of Cinderella, which took place at Lincoln Center during the holiday season of 2004. From October to early December 2006, Kitt co-starred in the off-Broadway musical Mimi le Duck.

Voice-over
In 1978, Kitt did the voice-over in a television commercial for the album Aja by the rock group Steely Dan. One of her more unusual roles was as Kaa in a 1994 BBC Radio adaptation of The Jungle Book. In 1998, she voiced Bagheera in the live-action direct-to-video Disney film The Jungle Book: Mowgli's Story. Kitt also lent her distinctive voice to Yzma in The Emperor's New Groove (for which she won her first Annie Award) and reprised her role in Kronk's New Groove and The Emperor's New School, for which she won two Emmy Awards and, in 2007–08, two more Annie Awards for Voice Acting in an Animated Television Production. She also voiced the villain Vexus in the Nickelodeon series My Life as a Teenage Robot.

Later years

1980s
In 1984, Kitt returned to the music charts with a disco song titled "Where Is My Man", the first certified gold record of her career. "Where Is My Man" reached the Top 40 on the UK Singles Chart, where it peaked at No. 36; the song became a standard in discos and dance clubs of the time and made the Top 10 on the US Billboard dance chart, where it reached No. 7. The single was followed by the album I Love Men on the Record Shack label. Kitt found new audiences in nightclubs across the UK and the United States, including a whole new generation of gay male fans, and she responded by frequently giving benefit performances in support of HIV/AIDS organizations. Her 1989 follow-up hit "Cha-Cha Heels" (featuring Bronski Beat), which was originally intended to be recorded by Divine, received a positive response from UK dance clubs, reaching No. 32 in the charts in that country. In 1988, Kitt replaced Dolores Gray in the West End production of Stephen Sondheim's Follies as Carlotta, receiving standing ovations every night for her rendition of "I'm Still Here" at the beginning of act 2. She went on to perform her own one-woman show at The Shaftesbury Theatre to sold-out houses for three weeks in early 1989 after Follies.

1990s
Kitt appeared with Jimmy James and George Burns at a fundraiser in 1990 produced by Scott Sherman, agent from the Atlantic Entertainment Group. It was arranged that James would impersonate Kitt and then Kitt would walk out to take the microphone. This was met with a standing ovation. In 1991, Kitt returned to the screen in Ernest Scared Stupid as Old Lady Hackmore. In 1992, she had a supporting role as Lady Eloise in Boomerang. In 1995, Kitt appeared as herself in an episode of The Nanny, where she performed a song in French and flirted with Maxwell Sheffield (Charles Shaughnessy). In November 1996, she appeared in an episode of Celebrity Jeopardy!. She also did a series of commercials for Old Navy.

2000s
In 2000, Eartha Kitt won an Annie Award for her starring voice role as "Yzma" in the Disney feature film The Emperor's New Groove, later reprising the role in 2005 in Disney's Kronk's New Groove. Kitt returned once again to the silver screen in 2003 with the charming role of Madame Zeroni in the film Holes based on the book by the same name, by author Louis Sachar. In August 2007, Kitt was the spokesperson for MAC Cosmetics' Smoke Signals collection. She re-recorded "Smoke Gets in Your Eyes" for the occasion, was showcased on the MAC website, and the song was played at all MAC locations carrying the collection for the month. She also appeared in the 2007 independent film And Then Came Love opposite Vanessa Williams. In her later years, Kitt made annual appearances in the New York Manhattan cabaret scene at venues such as the Ballroom and the Café Carlyle. As noted, Kitt did voice work for the animated projects The Emperor's New Groove and its spinoffs, as well as for My Life as a Teenage Robot. In April 2008, just months before her death, Kitt appeared at the Cheltenham Jazz Festival; the performance was recorded. She was also a guest star in "Once Upon a Time in Springfield" of The Simpsons, where she was depicted as one of Krusty's past marriages.

Personal life

After romances with producer Arthur Loew Jr., cosmetics magnate Charles Revson and banking heir John Barry Ryan III, she married John William McDonald, an associate of a real estate investment company, on June 9, 1960. They had one child, a daughter named Kitt McDonald, born on November 26, 1961 and baptized Catholic at Blessed Sacrament Catholic Church. Kitt and McDonald separated on July 1, 1963 and divorced on March 26, 1964.

A longtime Connecticut resident, Eartha Kitt lived in a converted barn on a sprawling farm in the Merryall section of New Milford for many years and was active in local charities and causes throughout Litchfield County. She later moved to Pound Ridge, New York, but returned in 2002 to the southern Fairfield County, Connecticut town of Weston, in order to be near her daughter Kitt and family. Her daughter, Kitt, married Charles Lawrence Shapiro in 1987.

Activism
Kitt was active in numerous social causes in the 1950s and 1960s. In 1966, she established the Kittsville Youth Foundation, a chartered and non-profit organization for underprivileged youths in the Watts area of Los Angeles. She was also involved with a group of youths in the area of Anacostia in Washington, D.C., who called themselves "Rebels with a Cause". Kitt supported the groups' efforts to clean up streets and establish recreation areas in an effort to keep them out of trouble by testifying with them before the House General Subcommittee on Education of the Committee on Education and Labor. In her testimony, in May 1967, Kitt stated that the Rebels' "achievements and accomplishments should certainly make the adult 'do-gooders' realize that these young men and women have performed in 1 short year – with limited finances – that which was not achieved by the same people who might object to turning over some of the duties of planning, rehabilitation, and prevention of juvenile delinquents and juvenile delinquency to those who understand it and are living it". She added that "the Rebels could act as a model for all urban areas throughout the United States with similar problems". "Rebels with a Cause" subsequently received the needed funding. Kitt was also a member of the Women's International League for Peace and Freedom; her criticism of the Vietnam War and its connection to poverty and racial unrest in 1968 can be seen as part of a larger commitment to peace activism. Like many politically active public figures of her time, Kitt was under surveillance by the CIA, beginning in 1956. After The New York Times discovered the CIA file on Kitt in 1975, she granted the paper permission to print portions of the report, stating: "I have nothing to be afraid of and I have nothing to hide."

Kitt later became a vocal advocate for LGBT rights and publicly supported same-sex marriage, which she considered a civil right. She had been quoted as saying: "I support it [gay marriage] because we're asking for the same thing. If I have a partner and something happens to me, I want that partner to enjoy the benefits of what we have reaped together. It's a civil-rights thing, isn't it?" Kitt famously appeared at many LGBT fundraisers, including a mega event in Baltimore, Maryland, with George Burns and Jimmy James. Scott Sherman, an agent at Atlantic Entertainment Group, stated: "Eartha Kitt is fantastic... appears at so many LGBT events in support of civil rights." In a 1992 interview with Dr. Anthony Clare, Kitt spoke about her gay following, saying:

Death
Kitt died of colon cancer on Christmas Day 2008, three weeks shy of her 82nd birthday at her home in Weston, Connecticut. Her daughter, Kitt McDonald, described her last days with her mother:

Awards and nominations
Kitt won awards for her film, television, and stage work. In 1960, the Hollywood Walk of Fame honored her with a star, which can be found on 6656 Hollywood Boulevard.

Major awards

Discography

Filmography

Film

Television

Documentary

Stage work

Video games

References

Further reading
 Gent, Helen (May 4, 2009). "Eartha Kitt: The Feline Femme Fatale". Marie Claire (Australia).

 Walsh, David (December 27, 2008). "Harold Pinter and Eartha Kitt, artists and opponents of imperialist war". World Socialist Web Site.

External links

 
 
 
 
 

 
 Eartha Kitt at TV Guide
 Image of Eartha Kitt with her fiance Bill McDonald recovering stolen items at a pawnshop in Los Angeles, California, 1960. Los Angeles Times Photographic Archive (Collection 1429). UCLA Library Special Collections, Charles E. Young Research Library, University of California, Los Angeles.

!colspan="3" style="background:#C1D8FF;"| Batman role
|-

1927 births
2008 deaths
African-American actresses
20th-century African-American women singers
African-American jazz musicians
Activists from New York (state)
Actresses from South Carolina
American anti–Vietnam War activists
American film actresses
American jazz singers
American musical theatre actresses
American people of Cherokee descent
American stage actresses
American television actresses
American video game actresses
American voice actresses
Annie Award winners
Cabaret singers
Deaths from cancer in Connecticut
Deaths from colorectal cancer
French-language singers of the United States
Jazz musicians from Connecticut
Jazz musicians from New York (state)
American LGBT rights activists
People from Harlem
People from New Milford, Connecticut
People from North, South Carolina
People from Pound Ridge, New York
People from Weston, Connecticut
RCA Victor artists
Singers from South Carolina
African-American activists
20th-century American actresses
21st-century American actresses
20th-century American singers
21st-century American singers
20th-century American women singers
21st-century American women singers
Women civil rights activists
21st-century African-American women singers